was a town located in Kaisō District, Wakayama Prefecture, Japan.

As of 2003, the town had an estimated population of 7,997 and a density of 207.39 persons per km2. The total area was 38.56 km2.

On January 1, 2006, Nokami, along with the town of Misato (also from Kaisō District), was merged to create the town of Kimino.

Dissolved municipalities of Wakayama Prefecture
Kimino, Wakayama